The Ferrovie dello Stato (FS; Italian State Railways) Class 741 is a class of 2-8-0 'Consolidation' steam locomotives, rebuilds from the FS Class 740 with a Franco-Crosti boiler; it was the last class of steam locomotives introduced in Italy.

Design
From 1940 the FS had experimented with the Franco-Crosti boiler, and after World War II it had been applied to several locomotives, including 90 Class 740 which were subsequently reclassified as Class 743. These rebuilds all had the preheater arranged in two barrels placed on the sides of the boiler; this arrangement had the disadvantage of subsequently increasing the axle load (therefore restricting route availability) and stretching the loading gauge to the limit, and precluded similar attempts from interested parties such as the British Railways.

An alternative arrangement had been experimented by the Deutsche Bundesbahn in 1952 on two DRB Class 42 locomotives, in which the barrels were placed below the boiler, which had been appropriately raised. To accede to BR's entreaties, the Società Franco studied a similar concept to transform a Class 740 with a single preheater barrel, and a single chimney placed on the right side of the locomotive, to test the concept (which would eventually lead to the ten Franco-Crosti BR Standard Class 9F locomotives). This concept was also interesting for the FS, as it promised to keep down the axle load, while keeping the system's fuel savings. To keep down the cost of transformations, the boiler was left largely unmodified, and only an exhaust steam injector was fitted.

Rebuilds
Therefore, in 1958 the FS approved the transformation of a batch of 80 Class 740 locomotives, which were subsequently reclassified as Class 741 (the 743.433 was likewise reclassified as 741.433).

Service
The Class 741 locomotives mainly operated in Sicily and in Veneto; they notably operated on the Pustertal line, renowned among enthusiasts as one of the last Italian lines where steam locomotives were in regular service, up to the latter half of the 1970s. Withdrawals began in 1968, and ended in the early 1980s.

Preservation
Two Class 741 locomotives were preserved:
 The 741.120 was restored for mainline use in 2007 and is currently operational.
 The 741.137 is a static exhibit at the Museo Nazionale Ferroviario di Pietrarsa.

Notes

Bibliography
 

741 II
2-8-0 locomotives
Railway locomotives introduced in 1954
Standard gauge locomotives of Italy
1′D h2 locomotives
Freight locomotives